Malathi de Alwis (6th Oct 1963-21 Jan 2021, also known as Mala de Alwis) was a Sri Lankan anthropologist. She taught at the International Centre for Ethnic Studies and the Faculty of Graduate Studies at the University of Colombo. She wrote about militarism, nationalism and feminism.

Career 
De Alwis earned her PhD in socio-cultural anthropology from the University of Chicago, where she was a founding member of the Women Against War Coalition and a winner of the Ruth Murray Memorial Prize for Best Essay in Gender Studies.

De Alwis was a senior research fellow at the International Centre for Ethnic Studies in Colombo, Sri Lanka. She also taught as a visiting professor at The New School in New York City. She also taught in the MA Program in Women's Studies at the Faculty of Graduate Studies, University of Colombo.

She wrote about feminist issues such as militarised sexual violence and the memorialisation of grief. Writing with Kumari Jayawardena, she explored how traditional perspectives in gender can become fixed during times of conflict, commenting "fundamentalism uses women's bodies as a battlefield in its struggle to appropriate institutional power". In 2014, de Alwis produced an exhibition with photographer Sharni Jayawardena called "Invoking The Goddess: Pattini-Kannaki Devotion in Sri Lanka" at the India International Centre in New Delhi.

Selected works

Books
Feminists Under Fire: Exchanges Across War Zones. Co-edited with Wenona Giles, Edith Klein & Neluka Silva. Toronto: Between the Lines (2003). (This vol. has been translated into Serbian/Bosnian/Croatian, Sinhala & Tamil).
Casting Pearls: The Women's Franchise Movement in Sri Lanka. With Kumari Jayawardena. Colombo: Social Scientists' Association, 2001.
Cat's Eye: A Feminist Gaze on Current Issues. Colombo: Social Scientists' Association, 2000.
Embodied Violence: Communalising Women's Sexuality in South Asia. Co-edited with Kumari Jayawardena. Delhi: Kali for Women/London: Zed Press, 1996.

Articles

"Feminism" in A Companion to the Anthropology of Politics, eds. Joan Vincent and David Nugent. Boston: Blackwell, 2004.
"Beyond Gender: Towards a Feminist Analysis of Humanitarianism and Development  in Sri Lanka" in Women's Studies Quarterly, Vol. XXXI: 3&4, Fall/Winter 2003. With Jennifer Hyndman.

Sources

External links
Personal webpage 

Feminist studies scholars
Sri Lankan anthropologists
Sri Lankan feminists
University of Chicago alumni
Multicultural feminism
Academic staff of the University of Colombo
Sri Lankan women scientists
The New School faculty